Cedric Lee Hayden (born August 4, 1934) is an American politician who was a member of the Oregon House of Representatives. His son, Cedric Ross Hayden, currently serves in the Oregon House of Representatives.

Born in Eugene, Oregon, Hayden was a dentist and attended the University of Oregon, Washington University School of Dental Medicine (DDS), and Loma Linda University (MPH).

References

1934 births
Living people
Republican Party members of the Oregon House of Representatives
Politicians from Eugene, Oregon
People from Linn County, Oregon
University of Oregon alumni
Washington University School of Dental Medicine alumni
Loma Linda University alumni
American dentists